Olaitan Yusuf (born 12 January 1982) is a Nigerian women's international footballer who plays as a forward. She is a member of the Nigeria women's national football team. She was part of the team at the 2003 FIFA Women's World Cup.

References

1982 births
Living people
Nigerian women's footballers
Nigeria women's international footballers
Place of birth missing (living people)
2003 FIFA Women's World Cup players
Women's association football forwards
Pelican Stars F.C. players
Yoruba sportswomen
People from Ilorin